Iryna Volodymyrivna Klymets (born 4 October 1994 in Chetvertnia) is a Ukrainian hammer thrower. She competed at the 2016 Summer Olympics in the women's hammer throw event; her result of 62.75 meters in the qualification round did not qualify her for the final round.

References 

1994 births
Living people
Ukrainian female hammer throwers
Olympic athletes of Ukraine
Athletes (track and field) at the 2016 Summer Olympics
Ukrainian Athletics Championships winners
Universiade gold medalists in athletics (track and field)
Universiade gold medalists for Ukraine
Medalists at the 2019 Summer Universiade
Athletes (track and field) at the 2020 Summer Olympics
Sportspeople from Volyn Oblast
21st-century Ukrainian women